Colasposoma austerum is a species of leaf beetle endemic to Socotra. It was described by Stefano Zoia in 2012. The species name, from austere, refers to the dark coloration of the dorsum.

References

austerum
Beetles of Asia
Endemic fauna of Socotra
Insects of the Arabian Peninsula
Beetles described in 2012